Peter Wu Junwei (27 June 1963 – 10 May 2022) was a Chinese Catholic prelate and bishop of the Prefecture Apostolic of Xinjiang from 2010 until his death in 2022.

Biography
Wu was born in Taiyuan, Shanxi, on 27 June 1963. After high school in July 1981, he was accepted to Jiangzhou Seminary. In March 1985 he entered the Shanxi Seminary.

He was ordained a priest by Zhang Xin on 9 December 1990. In August 2001 he was appointed president of the Shanxi Seminary, a position he held until August 2009.

On 8 September 2009, he was elected Bishop of the Prefecture Apostolic of Xinjiang, which was recognized by the Chinese Government and the Holy See. He accepted the episcopacy with the papal mandate on 21 September 2010.

References

External links
 Peter Wu Junwei at Catholic Hierarchy

1963 births
2022 deaths
People from Taiyuan
21st-century Roman Catholic bishops in China
Bishops appointed by Pope Benedict XVI